The Navy Supply Corps School (NSCS) is a 27-week training and "Basic Qualification Course" (BQC) in the United States located in Newport, Rhode Island. Those who complete the course become Commissioned officers in the Navy Supply Corps. The commanding officer is Capt. Jason Warner.

History 
The origins of the Navy Supply Corps School dates back to 1905, when the Naval Pay Officers School was first created in the Navy Department in Washington DC. This school closed three months after opening. In 1918 the Officers Material School for Supply Corps was formed in Princeton University to manage the influx of new officers being qualified for assignments during World War I. The Officers Material School for Supply Corps closed along with the ending of WWI. In 1921 The Navy Supply Corps School of Application in Washington, D.C. had 25 students deeming its first official class. This school was closed three years later. 

A new Navy School was opened by Capt. David Potter in 1934 as the Naval Finance and Supply School in the Philadelphia Naval Shipyard. In 1940 the Supply Corps Naval Reserve Officers School was established in Washington, D.C. Ten months later the two schools merged to form the Navy Supply Corps School (NSCS) at the Harvard University Graduate School of Business in Cambridge, Massachusetts. 1943 marked the first navy school allowing women located in Radcliffe College in Cambridge. This school was known as the Navy Supply Corps School for Women Accepted for Volunteer Emergency Service. 

The Naval Supply Operational Training Centre was established in 1944 in Bayonne, New Jersey but later became a part of the NSCS and renamed as such. The NSCS school then transferred to Athens, Georgia in 1954 as larger facilities were required. The NSCS operated adjacent to the University of Georgia's University High School. The Athens NSCS closed in 2010 to relocate to Newport, Rhode Island. In January 2011, NSCS opened opposite the Naval War College in Newport, Rhode Island. Naval Education and Training Command, 2020). In 2022 Capt. Jason Warner relieved Capt. Mike York as Commanding Officer of NSCS.

Navy Supply Corps Introductory Programs

Basic Qualifications Course and Division Officer Leadership Course 
The Basic Qualification Course (BQC) is a 20-week on duty program that teaches management techniques essential for understanding navy procedures through exams and practical assessments. The BQC teaches students supply management food service, retail operations, disbursing management, leadership and management and personnel administration. These supply skills are tested through practical applications and examinations. The aim of the BQC is to get freshly commissioned Supply Officers ‘ready for sea’. All BQC students must complete the five-day Division Officer Leadership Course. This course teaches junior officers the skills to become an effective leader in an operational environment. This course is taught through scenario driven activities through use of interactive videos, role-playing and group-based discussions. Students will be placed in a work centre, build working relationships with the Chain of Command, improve time management, and discuss functional administration all to develop leadership principles.

Basic Qualifications Course - Navy Reserve 
This program teaches individuals to become Navy Reserve supply officers. The Basic Qualifications Course - Navy Reserve program teaches fundamental, technical and managerial information required to be an effective Supply officer in the Navy Reserve. The total duration of the BQC-NR is 15 months. This time is made up of self-paced correspondence work with three different on-site training intervals. The BQC-NR course curriculum comprises Supply Management, Food Service, Disbursing Management, Retail Operations, and Leadership and Management. A minimum grade of 80 percent is required for each curriculum aspect.

Intermediate Leadership Course 
The Intermediate Leadership Course is a five-day program that re-educates Supply Officers if they are taking a Department Head type role. This trains officers to think as a managerially Department Head rather than a functional Division Officer. Thus, this course is taught through role playing, group-based decisions and brainstorming. Particular leadership principles taught include competition and collaboration amongst peers and superiors, management of expectations, non-reactive leadership, command climate influences, project and systems management, and growing/ developing junior Divisions Officers for the future.

Post Introductory Officer Courses

Transportation of Hazardous Materials 
The TRANS HAZMAT course provides a detailed study on transportation of hazardous materials by rail, water and motor and provide an in-depth examination of procedure when transporting hazardous materials by commercial or military air.  TRANS HAZMAT also discusses the role of the Department of Transportation, Defense Transportation System, commercial carriers and different regional laws regarding handling, packaging, marking, labelling and placarding of hazardous materials. Practical learning is heavily used for greater comprehension through the use of mock-up HAZMAT offices and storage rooms. Students will learn about relevant codes regarding transportation, labelling and inspections. TRANS HAZMAT has three separate examinations on regulations determining whether students pass the course. Recertification/ additional certification is required after every effective two-year period after the TRANS HAZ MAT qualification credit is acquired.

Recertification is acquired through the Transportation of Hazardous Materials Recertification (TRANS HAZMAT RECERT) Course. This requires students to certify hazardous materials for transportation. They must have completed the TRANS HAZMAT or equivalent course within the last two years. This course discusses the same transportation elements of the TRANS HAZMAT course. Fulfilment of the course is determined by one final examination. The aim of this course is to keep transportation managers familiar with new regulations.

Joint Aviation Supply and Maintenance Material Management 
The JASMMM course teaches students technical and management aviation skills in order to create synergy between maintenance and supply members through communication in order to improve the weapon support system. Areas discussed include Naval Aviation Enterprise initiatives, Aviation Consolidated Allowance List, Inventory management, advanced management/ leadership fundamentals and all levels of Maintenance influencing Flight-Line Operations. The topics are taught through case studies with practical activities to enhance understanding. JASMMM's aim is to enhance aircraft readiness through collaboration with maintenance members and logisticians.

Reserve Supply Management and Advanced Refresher Training 
RESMART is catered to the education on supply management procedures to logistics specialists. This is a fast-paced course that covers the relevant areas regarding logistics specialists. RESMART teaches through lecture and practical format, and requires students to research, create and present demonstrations on supply management. The aim of RESMART is to develop confidence and presentation skills in students so they can train other reserve units in supply information.

Introduction to Expeditionary Logistics 
IEL teaches about logistics in an expeditionary environment. This involves studying the joint planning process, the naval logistics chain of command and deployment concerns in a militant environment. IEL is a two-week resident course. Modules covered include Unified Commands, Naval Logistics, Joint Operational Planning, Advanced Base Logistics, Foreign Humanitarian Assistance, Host Nation Support and an overview of the Navy's Expeditionary commands. IEL is learnt through a series of seminars with guest speakers and examined through a final group exercise scenario drawing from knowledge of the seminars.

Supply Officer Department Head Course 
The SODHC four-week program is for individuals wanting to become Supply Officer Department Heads afloat. SODHC teaches five key areas of supply management that is Supply Management, Food Service, Retail Operations, Disbursing Management and Postal Operations. Additionally, SODHC students are taught more specific functions including Configuration Management, Hazardous Materials Management and Submarine-specific Supply Functions. The aim of SODHC is to make Lieutenants effective and efficient managers that supply officers ought to be.

A similar course is provided to Senior Supply Corps Officers called the Senior Supply Officer Department Head (SR SODHC) course. SR SODHC teaches all the same supply management topics and other senior role requirements such as ethics, financial management and inventory. This senior role means students must assemble reports such as monthly and annual financial management plans. The 8 day SR SODHC program is aimed at reprogramming officers to take charge as Supply Officers in the Department Head.

Advanced Management Program 
AMP teaches upper and middle management leadership skills in order to help managers create and introduce strategies, supervise groups of people, and utilize managerial competence and experience into policy-level perspective. Students will undertake group discussions and presentations to overcome workplace problems. The aim of AMP is to develop managerial abilities and skills such as communication and overcoming workplace problems to become more effective managers.

International Logistics Executive Advanced Development  
ILEAD is a seven-week course focused on providing relevant logistical and supply chain management information useful from a militaristic perspective. This course is catered to senior international officers. ILEAD includes a two-week AMP course in order to grant full comprehension of the syllabus.

Students and Faculty 
The Newport Naval Station has approximately 9500 students annually engaging directly with the school base. The NSCS has about 5000 individuals receive training from the school per year.

References

External links
 Official Facebook page
 Navy Supply Corps School and State Normal School Collection from the Digital Library of Georgia
 U.S. Navy Supply Corps School historical marker

United States Navy schools and training
Athens, Georgia
Schools in Newport County, Rhode Island